[1] There is an additional higher Grade Companion of Honour With Collar but the post-nominal letters are the same

References 

Post
Post-nominal letters
M